Giorvis Duvergel (born September 8, 1979) is an olympic baseball player for Cuba. He was part of the Cuban team which won a silver medal at the 2008 Summer Olympics.

References

Living people
1979 births
Olympic baseball players of Cuba
Baseball players at the 2007 Pan American Games
Baseball players at the 2008 Summer Olympics
Baseball players at the 2011 Pan American Games
Olympic silver medalists for Cuba
Olympic medalists in baseball
Medalists at the 2008 Summer Olympics
Pan American Games gold medalists for Cuba
Pan American Games bronze medalists for Cuba
Pan American Games medalists in baseball
Central American and Caribbean Games gold medalists for Cuba
Competitors at the 2006 Central American and Caribbean Games
Central American and Caribbean Games medalists in baseball
Medalists at the 2007 Pan American Games
21st-century Cuban people